Events from the year 1845 in art.

Events
February 7 – At the British Museum in London, a drunken visitor smashes the Portland Vase which takes months to repair. It has since been reconstructed three times.
March – Honoré Daumier begins publishing the series of drawings Les Gens de justice ("The Men of Justice") in the satirical Paris magazine Le Charivari.
Heinrich Hoffmann anonymously publishes Lustige Geschichten und drollige Bilder mit 15 schön kolorierten Tafeln für Kinder von 3–6 Jahren ("Funny Stories and Whimsical Pictures with 15 Beautifully Coloured Panels for Children Aged 3 to 6", later known as Struwwelpeter) in Germany.
Brita Sofia Hesselius opens a photography studio in Karlstad, making her the first known Swedish female professional photographer.

Works

Jean Auguste Dominique Ingres – Portrait of Comtesse d'Haussonville
Jan August Hendrik Leys – Franz Floris se rendant a une fête
Adolph Menzel – The Balcony Room (Das Balkonzimmer)
Andrew Morton – The United Service
Nicolaas Pieneman – Portrait of Jan Jacob Rochussen
William Ranney – The Battle of Cowpens
Pierre-Henri Révoil completed by Michel Philibert Genod – Pharamond lifted on a shield by the Franks
Théodore Rousseau – Hoarfrost
Clarkson Frederick Stanfield – The Action and Capture of the Spanish Xebeque Frigate El Gamo
John Mix Stanley – Buffalo Hunt on the Southwestern Prairies
J. M. W. Turner – Sunrise with Sea Monsters

Births
January 21 – Harriet Backer, Norwegian painter (died 1932)
July 4 (probable date) – Edmonia Lewis, American sculptor (died 1907)
October 1 – Adolf Oberländer, German caricaturist (died 1923)
October 30 – Antonin Mercié, French sculptor and painter (died 1916)
 undated
Charles Burton Barber, English genre painter (died 1894)
Alina Forsman, Finnish sculptor (died 1899)

Deaths
January 4 – Léopold Boilly, French painter (born 1761)
January 5 – Robert Smirke, English painter (born 1753)
January 21 – Samuel Colman, English painter (born 1780)
April 20 – Thomas Phillips, English portrait and subject painter (born 1770)
May 15 – Kapiton Zelentsov, Russian painter notable for his illustrations for books (born 1790)
July 29 – François Joseph Bosio, French sculptor (born 1769)
September 29 – John Scarlett Davis, English painter (born 1804)
October 30 – Nicolas Toussaint Charlet, French designer and painter, especially of military subjects (born 1792)
November 24 – Karl Wilhelm Wach, German painter (born 1787)
date unknown
Fryderyk Bauman, Polish architect and sculptor-decorator (born 1765/70)
Yakov Kolokolnikov-Voronin – Russian portraitist and icon-painter (born 1782)
probable – Thomas Douglas Guest, British portrait painter (born 1781)

References

 
Years of the 19th century in art
1840s in art